Prajñā (734), was a 9th century Buddhist monk born in Kapisa, near modern Kabul, Afghanistan.

He visited Tang China and contributed several important retranslations of Sanskrit sutras into Chinese. Some of his main works are:

 The Avatamsaka Sutra
 The Heart Sutra
 The Mahayana Sutra of Mind Meditation from the Jataka tales

Prajñā reportedly befriended the Japanese monk Kūkai, future founder of Shingon Buddhism, during his pilgrimage to China. He is said to have helped Kūkai learn and understand Sanskrit source texts.

According to the Zhenyuan Catalogue, Prajñā translated a work known as the Satparamita Sutra into Chinese with the help of the Christian monk Jingjing. This work does not survive.

See also
Silk Road transmission of Buddhism

References

Further reading
Keown, Damian (2003). Dictionary of Buddhism. New York: Oxford University Press. 

Medieval India
Indian Buddhist monks
9th-century Indian monks
9th-century Buddhist monks
Afghan monks
Afghan Buddhists
Indian Buddhists